Hōdō (法道) or Hōdō Sennin (法道仙人) was an Indian hermit and sage.

According to legend, from the 6th to 7th centuries CE, Hōdō traveled from India through China and the Korean kingdom of Baekje and eventually arrived in Japan. He is recognized as the founder of temples in the mountains of Harima Province and is associated with several chokugan-ji (勅願寺), Buddhist temples built at the request of the reigning emperor.

Tradition holds that when Hōdō came to Japan, he was accompanied by the deity Gozu Tennō (牛頭天王; Sanskrit: Gośīrṣa devarāja), who was later enshrined at Hiromine Shrine and Yasaka Shrine.

While engaged in ascetic practice on Mount Rokkō at the Kumoga Iwa Rock (雲ヶ岩), Hōdō is said to have been approached by the deity Vaiśravaṇa riding on purple clouds. It was after this encounter that Hōdō built Tamon-ji in Hyōgo Prefecture to enshrine the Kumoga Iwa Rock, Rokkō-Hime-Daizen-no-Kami (六甲比命大善神), and the Shinkyō Iwa Rock.

Other names
Legend says that Hōdō would fly through the air with food and money in an iron bowl to offer to those in need, which gained him the nickname Hihatsu no Hōdō (飛鉢の法道 lit. "Flying Bowl Hōdō").

It is also said that on one occasion, he happened upon a ship carrying rice that had been paid as land tax. Hōdō asked for one bowl of rice, to which the tax man refused. As a result, when Hōdō flew away, the bags of rice rose into the air and followed him. The tax man pursued the ascetic into the mountains and apologized for his miserliness. He promised to provide Hōdō with one bowl of rice for the return of his rice bags.

As the area around Ichijō-ji is known for it high quality rice production, it is said that this originated from the bowl of rice procured by Hōdō. For this reason, he is also known as Kūhatsu Sennin (空鉢仙人, lit. "Empty Bowl Sage"), as he always gave away whatever he had obtained in his iron bowl.

Affiliated temples

Senkō-ji, in Tonami, Toyama Prefecture
Kannon-ji, in Fukuchiyama, Kyoto Prefecture
Gaya-in, in Miki, Hyōgo Prefecture
Kyōkai-ji, in Miki, Hyōgo Prefecture
Ichijō-ji, in Kasai, Hyōgo Prefecture
Fukō-ji, in Kasai, Hyōgo Prefecture
Okusan-ji, in Kasai, Hyōgo Prefecture

Nyoi-ji, in Kōbe, Hyōgo Prefecture
Shakubu-ji, in Kōbe, Hyōgo Prefecture
Tōri Tenjō-ji, in Kōbe, Hyōgo Prefecture
Kinkō-ji, in Kōbe, Hyōgo Prefecture
Hōju-ji, in Kōbe, Hyōgo Prefecture
Tamon-ji, in Kōbe, Hyōgo Prefecture
Chōkō-ji, in Katō, Hyōgo Prefecture

Zenryū-ji, in Katō, Hyōgo Prefecture
Kiyomizu-dera, in Katō, Hyōgo Prefecture
Kōmyō-ji, in Katō, Hyōgo Prefecture
Saihō-ji, in Tamba-Sasayama, Hyōgo Prefecture
Tōkutsu-ji, in Tamba-Sasayama, Hyōgo Prefecture
Sairin-ji, in Nishiwaki, Hyōgo Prefecture
Bodai-ji, in Sanda, Hyōgo Prefecture

Jōshō-ji, in Tanba, Hyōgo Prefecture
Hōraku-ji, in Kamikawa, Hyōgo Prefecture
Shippō-ji, in Kamikawa, Hyōgo Prefecture
Enman-ji, in Taka, Hyōgo Prefecture
Hōdō-ji, in Asago, Hyōgo Prefecture
Chōkoku-ji, in Kurayoshi, Tottori Prefecture
Senryū-ji, in Shikokuchūō, Ehime Prefecture
Rakan-ji, in Nakatsu, Ōita Prefecture

See also
Sennin
Vaiśravaṇa
Emperor Kōtoku
Wakan Sansai Zue

References

Indian Buddhists
Japanese people of Indian descent
India–Japan relations
Shinbutsu shūgō
Gion faith